Saint Kitts and Nevis–Spain relations are the bilateral and diplomatic relations between these two countries. Saint Kitts and Nevis does not have embassy in Spain, but its embassy in United Kingdom is accredited for Spain. Spain also has no embassy on the islands, but its embassy in Kingston, Jamaica, is accredited to them.

Diplomatic relations 
Spain established diplomatic relations with Saint Kitts and Nevis in 1987 (March 19). Spain does not have a resident Embassy in Saint Kitts and Nevis. The Embassy of Spain in Jamaica is accredited, under multiple accreditation, in Basseterre. Saint Kitts and Nevis also does not have
of Embassy resident in Spain. The Ambassador resident in the United Kingdom is also accredited in Spain. Saint Kitts and Nevis has participated in the various Spain CARICOM summits held in 1999, 2002, 2006 and 2008.

Economic relations 
The economic relations between Spain and Saint Kitts and Nevis are very small. The main exported products are vegetable preparations,
vegetables and others, as well as machinery and ceramic products, while Spain imports machinery and electrical and maritime or river navigation equipment.

Cooperation 
In 2008, within the framework of EXPO ZARAGOZA 2008, a project was executed in the water sector (expansion of the water chlorination network and improvement of water treatment systems). From 2007 to 2012, AECID funded a lecturer at Clarence Fitzroy Bryant Collage State. In general terms, cooperation is channeled through the Spain-Caribbean Community Fund (CARICOM) of the AECID. The cooperation program with CARICOM is mainly aimed at supporting regional integration and institutional strengthening of the Caribbean Community.

The interlocutor of the Spanish Cooperation is the CARICOM Secretariat whose headquarters are in Georgetown (Guyana), and all the actions are included within the Regional Cooperation Program with CARICOM. Saint Kitts and Nevis benefits from regional projects, such as the Regional Center for Advanced Technologies for High-Performance Crops (CEATA) for training in new agricultural technologies, based in Jamaica.
In terms of health, preferential attention is given to noncommunicable diseases, an area less attended by other donors.

The "Cervical Cancer Prevention and Control Project" (program of noncommunicable diseases) stands out for its cross-cutting gender component, having already held 2 regional training seminars in Jamaica and Trinidad and Tobago, in the months of June and July 2009 with provision of colposcopes for all CARICOM countries. Specifically, Alexandra Hospital, on the island of Nevis, received a donation from a colposcope in October 2009.

The country is also one of the ten members of Caricom that is part of a fishing project. The Embassy of Spain accredited in Basseterre, with residence in Kingston, Jamaica, carries out a work to support the teaching of Spanish through the donation of AVE scholarships for learning Spanish.

Throughout 2014, a youth violence prevention project called “Youth-on-Youth Violence in Schools and Communities” was launched with funding from AECID through the Spain-CARICOM Fund, which started with National Consultations in various educational centers in Basseterre, the capital, on June 2, 2014.

See also 
 Foreign relations of Saint Kitts and Nevis    
 Foreign relations of Spain

References 

 
Spain
Saint Kitts and Nevis